PX domain containing serine/threonine kinase also known as PXK is a protein which in humans is encoded by the PXK gene.

Function 

PXK binds to the Na⁺/K⁺-ATPase beta-1 (ATP1B1) and beta-3 (ATP1B3) subunits and modulates both Na⁺/K⁺-ATPase enzymatic and ion pump activities.

See also 

 PX domain

References